Puzhakkal, also Puzhakkal Padam, is part of Puzhakkal block of Thrissur. A decade ago, Puzhakkal was a vast paddy field situated in the two sides of State Highway 69 (Kerala) going to Kunnamkulam. The place is named after Puzhakkal River, which flows through this region. Now, it has become the most developed suburban area of Thrissur city. Many of the major nerve centres of Thrissur City, including the Thrissur Collectorate, Vilangan Hills, Amala Institute of Medical Sciences, Rashtriya Sanskrit Sansthan, Government Law College, Thrissur, Kendriya Vidyalaya, District Industries Centre of Kerala Govt., Ministry of Micro Small and Medium Enterprises under Government of India(MSME)., Lulu Convention Center and many more are in the block. Many major automotive companies have commercial spaces here, including Hero Motors, Tata Motors, Fiat, Ford, Nissan, Hyundai, Toyota, Suzuki, Honda and more. A national-level tennis academy is also attracting tennis players here.

India's second largest and Kerala's largest international convention center, Lulu Convention Centre, is situated in Puzhakkal. Sobha Group's Sobha City Mall and Sobha City, Kerala's first and currently biggest integrated township is here with villas and high-rise luxury apartments, the only one of same in state having helipad facilities. Recently boating services for tourism have started across river. KINFRA is setting up an industrial park in Puzhakkal. West fort Hitech hospital, a specialty healthcare center, is also in here. A transit terminal Mobility hub also to be set up on lines of Vyttila Mobility Hub to reduce traffic congestion was recently approved to be realized soon. Having a railway terminal also at Amala Nagar just 3 km away, the suburb town may have major development scope in near future.

Puzhakkal is known for the "Dharmasastha temple" where the presiding deity is Lord Ayyappa. The temple receives many visitors every year during the traditional sabarimala season between October and January. The St Mary's church in Puzhakkal is another nearby place of worship. The church has an affiliated school which remains the only school in the Puzhakkal block.   

The area has lush green paddy fields and three canals flowing through them as part of the Peechi irrigation project.

References

See also
Thrissur
Thrissur District

Suburbs of Thrissur city
Shopping districts and streets in India